Anthony Lee (born 4 June 1937) is an English former amateur footballer who played on the left wing in the Football League for Southport. He also played non-league football for Cheadle Rovers.

References

1937 births
Living people
Footballers from Manchester
English footballers
Association football wingers
Southport F.C. players
English Football League players